Li Zhongyi (born 14 April 1997) is a Chinese footballer currently playing as a midfielder for Shijiazhuang Gongfu.

Club career
Shortly after joining Guangzhou Evergrande in 2014, he was named in English newspaper The Guardian as one of the most promising young footballers born in 1997. Following a collapsed loan move to Wuhan Zall in 2018, Li sued Guangzhou Evergrande.

He left Guangzhou Evergrande after six years, in 2019, and signed with China League Two side Zibo Cuju. In 2020, he went on trial with Chinese Super League side Qingdao Huanghai, but ultimately would remain with Zibo Cuju for the 2020 season.

In 2022, following one season with the club, it was announced that Li had left Inner Mongolia Caoshangfei. He joined Shijiazhuang Gongfu, and made three appearances in the China League One in the 2022 season.

International career
Li has been called up to the China under-22 side.

Career statistics

Club

Notes

References

1997 births
Living people
People from Suihua
Footballers from Heilongjiang
Chinese footballers
China youth international footballers
Association football midfielders
China League Two players
China League One players
Guangzhou F.C. players